Malèna is the soundtrack of the 2000 film Malèna starring Monica Bellucci, Giuseppe Sulfaro, Luciano Federico and Matilde Piana. The original score was composed by Ennio Morricone.

The album was nominated for the Academy Award for Best Original Score and the Golden Globe Award for Best Original Score.

The title track "Malèna" has been recorded by both Yo-Yo Ma, and sung by Hayley Westenra with lyrics by Hayley Westenra.

Track list
Inchini Ipocriti E Disperazione
Malèna
Passeggiata In Paese
Visioni
Nella Casa...
Malèna (End Titles)
Linciaggio
Orgia
Il Ritorno
Bisbigli Della Gente
Ma L'Amore No
Casino Bolero
Altro Casino
Visioni (Fantasie D'Amore)
Cinema D'Altri Tempi
Ipocrisie
Pensieri Di Sesso
Momenti Difficili

Ennio Morricone soundtracks
2000 soundtrack albums